Alexandre Dang (born 19 May 1973 in Strasbourg, France) is a French visual artist. He lives and works currently in Brussels, Belgium.

Biography

Alexandre Dang comes originally from a scientific background (Engineer at the Ecole Polytechnique (Paris) and at the Ecole Nationale des Ponts et Chaussées (Paris).

Alexandre Dang has developed his own artistic creation; he creates artworks integrating solar energy to enable them to move (« kinetic art »). He is part of an artistic movement called Solar Art or Solar Artwork, which incorporates solar energy in artworks.

Alexandre Dang started his artistic work in 2004. He has been influenced by artists like Alexander Calder with his mobiles and stabiles and Jean Tinguely with his machines. He creates especially in situ installations with "Dancing Solar Flowers".

"Each solar flower is made up of an engine and a solar cell. The solar cell collects sunlight and turns it into electricity. With electricity, the motor starts and the flower moves".

"This is socially conscious art that raises awareness about respect for the environment, sustainable development, renewable energy, and more generally, our modes of production and consumption".

Beyond the aesthetic dimension, his art works also trigger debate on the use of energy today and on the energy perspectives in the future. In addition, Alexandre Dang organizes regularly workshops to raise public awareness on sustainable energy through art. Some workshops were held notably in schools (European School of Uccle (Brussels), European School of Woluwe-Saint-Lambert (Brussels) ... ), during the European Solar Days or during festivals such as the festival Couleur Café.

He cofounded Solar Solidarity International (a Non Profit International Association) which raises awareness about solar energy and contributes financially to solar electrification projects in developing countries (schools, hospitals ... ).

Alexandre Dang has supported the solar electrification of the hospital of Daga-Youndoum, in Senegal; the solar electrification of a school in M'Pédougou, in Mali; the electrification, heating and solar cooking of the orphanage MikumiKids in Tanzania.

Exhibitions

2018 

 Shifang Cultural Center, Chongqing, China - "Harmony and Peace", Solo exhibition
 Yonsei University, Seoul, South of Korea - Video exhibition
 Cultural Center Correios, Rio de Janeiro, Brasil - In situ installation of Dancing Solar Flowers "Luz, Vida e Paz"
 Heritage Space Cultural Center, Hanoi, Vietnam - "Light and Life", Solo exhibition
 Sun Gallery, Hayward, CA, USA - Video exhibition

2017 

 Chengdu A4 Art Museum, Chengdu, China - Dancing Solar Flowers at ISTART Children's Art Festival
 Muzeon Park of Arts, Moscow, Russia - Installation of Dancing Solar Flowers in cooperation with Fond Podsolnuh at the Moscow Flower Show
 Kronstadt, Saint-Petersburg, Russia - Installation of Dancing Solar Flowers at Kronfest "Ecology and Art Festival"
 Elektrownia, Radom, Poland - Monographic exhibition
 Museo Luigi Bailo, Treviso, Italie - Dancing Solar Flowers
 Villa Méditerranée, Marseille, France - Dancing Solar Flowers, In Situ Solar Art

2016 

 Museum of National History, Genève, Switzerland - Dancing Solar Flowers
 KINTEX (Korea International Exhibition Center), Goyang, South of Korea - Special exhibition, Dancing Solar Flowers by curator KIM Ji-Yong
 Bibliothèque EPM, Medellin, Colombia - Dancing Solar Flowers
 Museum of Contemporary Art (MOCA), Xi'An, Chine - Dancing Solar Flowers
 Nian Dai Mai Shu Guan, Wenzhou, Chine - Dancing Solar Flowers
 Arcade, Aix-en-Provence, France - Solar Art - Video

2015 

 Art Tower Mito, Mito, Japan - Dancing Solar Flowers
 National Museum of Singapore, Singapore - Dancing Solar Flowers at "Masak Masak" Children's Season
 Museo dei Bambini (MUBA), Milan, Italie - Dancing Solar Flowers
 International Kinetic Art Exhibition and Symposium, Boynton Beach, Miami, Florida, USA - Dancing Sol'Art Butterflies
 John Jay College, New York City, USA - Dancing Solar Flowers
 Museum of National History, Mons, Belgium - The Field of Turning Solar Sunflowers

2014 

 Roundabout N4 / N958 (Highway E 42, exit 12), Namur, Belgium - Some seeds fell into good soil and produced a crop
 Hsinchu, Taipei, Taiwan - MORIART Festival - Dancing Solar Flowers and Wind Flowers
 Central House of Artists, "The State Tretyakov Gallery at Krymsky Val", Moscou, Russie - Dancing Solar Flowers at Science Art
 Museum of Contemporary Art (MOCA), Taipei, Taiwan - Dancing Solar Flowers
 Parc du Cinquantenaire, Brussels, Belgium - Dancing Solar Flowers at Fête de l'Environnement
 French Institute - Centre Saint-Louis, Rome, Vatican - Dancing Solar Flowers

2013
 Biennale of Cerveira, Vila Nova de Cerveira, Casa Amarela, Portugal - Dancing Solar Flowers and Butterflies 
 Alliance Française of Tianjin, China - Dancing Solar Flowers
 Espace Electra, Fondation EDF, France - Made in Light - Vous êtes la Lumière du Monde
 Marco Polo Airport, Venice, Italy - Dancing Solar Poppies and Butterflies 
 Chateau Swan, OCT Project Department of Xi'an, China - Dancing Solar Flowers
 Musée des Beaux-Arts de Tournai, Tournai, Belgium - Champ de Tournesols Solaires Tournants 
 Le French May, Alliance Française of Hong Kong, Hong Kong, China - Dancing Solar Flowers

2012

 Soho Gallery for Digital Art, New York City, USA - Land Art Generator Initiative (LAGI) - The Turning Sunflowers
 16th International Biennale of Small Paper Format, Nismes, Belgium - Dancing Solar Flower
 European Commission (Berlaymont), Brussels, Belgium - EU Sustainable Energy Week - The Field of Turning Solar Sunflowers
 Parc du Cinquantenaire, Brussels, Belgium - Fête de l'Environnement - Dancing Solar Flowers and Solar Art
 Place du Sablon, Brussels, Belgium - The Solar Flowers Dancing in "Hymne à la Vie"
 Singapore Art Museum (SAM), Singapore - Singapore Art Garden 2012 - The Solar Flowers Dancing on the Façade of SAM
 World Expo 2012, Belgian Pavillon, Yeosu, South Korea - Dancing Solar Waves and Flowers

2011

 European Parliament, Brussels, Belgium - Dancing Solar Flowers
 Singapore Art Museum (SAM), Singapore - Dancing Solar Flowers 
 Tallinn 2011 - European Capital of Culture, Tallinn, Estonia - Tallinn Flower Festival - Field of Dancing Solar Flowers
 Atomium, Brussels, Belgium - International Day of Missing Children in cooperation with Child Focus - Dancing Solar Forget-Me-Not
 European Parliament, Brussels, Belgium - International Day of Missing Children in cooperation with Missing Children Europe - Dancing Solar Forget-Me-Not
 Museum of Natural History, Mons, Belgium - Field of Dancing Solar Flowers

2010

 Royal Palace, Brussels, Belgium - Child Focus and Missing Children Europe - Dancing Solar Flowers and Dancing Solar Forget-Me-Not
 European Commission (Charlemagne Building), Brussels, Belgium - Green Week
 European Commission (Berlaymont), Brussels, Belgium - NGO Missing Children Europe - Field of Dancing Solar Forget-Me-Not 
 World Expo Shanghai 2010 – European & Belgian Pavilion, Shanghai, China - The Dancing Solar Magnolias 
 Royal Greenhouses of Laeken, Brussels, Belgium - The Dancing Solar Forget-Me-Not 
 European Commission Building (DG AIDCO), Brussels, Belgium - EU Sustainable Energy Week - Dancing Solar Art

2009

 Espace Champerret, Paris, France - Manifestation of Contemporary Art (MAC-Paris) 
 Galeries Royales Saint Hubert, Brussels, Belgium - Child Focus for the Day of missing children - Dang'cing Solar Forget-Me-Not
 Royal Greenhouses of Laeken, Brussels, Belgium - Child Focus - Dang'cing Sol'Art Forget-Me-Not
 Madou Tower and European Commission (Charlemagne Building), Brussels, Belgium - European Sustainable Energy Week - Dang'cing Sol'Art Mobiles
 Bozar, Brussels, Belgium - Truc Troc - Dang'cing Sol'Art Flowers

2008

 Feria Valencia, Spain - European Photovoltaic Solar Energy Conference and Exhibition - Dang'cing Sol'Art Flowers
 European School of Brussels I, Brussels, Belgium - 50th Anniversary - Dang'cing Solar Art
 Council of the European Union (Justus Lipsius), Brussels, Belgium - Joy for Europe: United in Diversity! - The Sol'Art Flowers Dang'cing 
 European Commission (Charlemagne Building), Brussels, Belgium - Sustainable Energy Week - Dang'cing Solar Art

2007
 European Commission (Berlaymont), Brussels, Belgium - Schuman Trophy Ceremony 
 Place Royale, Brussels, Belgium Belgian - National Day - The Solar Flowers Dang'cing for Europe
 Chapelle of Europe, Brussels, Belgium - The Solar Flowers Dang'cing for Europe 
 European Commission (Berlaymont), Brussels, Belgium - European Union Sustainable Energy Week - Europe Dang'cing for Joy

2006
 Autoworld, Brussels, Belgium - DG TREN Day - Dang'cing Sunflowers
 European Parliament, Brussels, Belgium - 1st General Assembly of the Technology Platform for Photovoltaics - Dang'cing Sunflowers
 European Commission (Berlaymont), Brussels, Belgium - Journée Porte Ouverte - Dang'cing Solar Art
 Renewable Energy House, Brussels, Belgium - Inauguration of the Renewable Energy House - Dang'cing Sunflowers
 European Commission (Berlaymont), Brussels, Belgium - The Field of Dang'cing Sunflowers

2005
 Cathedrale St Michel & Ste Gudule, Brussels, Belgium - "Messe des Artistes" on 20 November - Dang'cing Solar Art
 Conference Center, Barcelona, Spain - International conference and exhibition of solar energy - Dang'cing Solar Art
 European Commission (Charlemagne Building), Brussels, Belgium - Green Week - Dang'cing Solar Art
 European Parliament, Brussels, Belgium - Dang'cing Solar Art

2004
 European Parliament, Brussels, Belgium - Dang'cing Solar Art
 European Commission (Charlemagne Building), Brussels, Belgium - Launch of the European Technology Platform for Photovoltaics - Viva Europa !

Prices
 Best Young Artist of the Year Award at 2018 GAMMA Young Artist Competition
 Prix d'Art Chrétien, Eglise de la Trinité, Brussels, Belgium Alexandre Dang is being awarded by the Prix d'Art Chrétien for "The Resurrection"
 Selection at the "Prix de la jeune sculpture de la Communauté française de Belgique" - University of Liège - Former Abbey of Gembloux, Belgium

Workshops

 2018 : Brickworks, Toronto, Canada - Fill in yours own pattern!
 2017 : Children Hospital RDKB, Moscow, Russia - Fill in yours own pattern!
 2016 : Sharjah International Book Fair, Sharjah, Emirates - Fill in yours own pattern!
 2015 : Morocco Solar Festival, Ouarzazate, Morocco - Fill in your own pattern!
 2015 : Art Works for Change - Videos of Dancing Solar Flowers at "Footing the Bill: Art and Our Ecological Footprint"
 2013 : Ecole Robert Dubois, Hôpital des Enfants Reine Fabiola, Brussels, Belgium - Fill in your own pattern!
 2012 : Parc Schuman school, Woluwe-Saint-Lambert, Brussels, Belgium - Fill in your own pattern!
 2009 : European School of Woluwe-Saint-Lambert, Brussels, Belgium - Fill in your own pattern!
 2008 : European School of Brussels I, Brussels, Belgium - Art and Renewable Energy
 2008 : European Commission (Berlaymont), Brussels, Belgium - With the pupils of the European School of Brussels I (Uccle) - Dang'cing Sol'Art Flowers

Conferences

2018
 Heritage Space Cultural Center, Hanoi, Vietnam - Conference, Artist talk “Solar Art”

2017
 University of Liège, Complex Opéra, Liège, Belgium - World Humanities Conference, co-organised by UNESCO, 8 Aug
 Muzeon Park of Arts, Moscow, Russia - Conference on "Solar Art" in cooperation with Fond Podsolnuh at the Moscow Flower Show

2016
 Biblioteca EPM, Medellín, Colombia - Conference on Solar Art
 Museum of Contemporary Art (MOCA), Xi’AN, China - Conference on Solar Art
 Arcade, Aix-en-Provence, France - Conference on Solar Art

2014
 Furman University, John's Hall 101, Greenville, South Carolina, USA  - Conference on Solar Art

2013
 European Commission (Van Maerlant 2), Brussels, Belgium - Conference "How solar art becomes art?" in the frame of the EU Sustainable Energy Week 
 Bilbao Arte, Bilbao, Spain - Conference "La Ciencia y el Arte"

2012
 European Commission (Van Maerlant 2), Brussels, Belgium Conference "Artworks Powered by Solar Energy" in the frame of the EU Sustainable Energy Week

2011
 Délégation Bretagne, Brussels, Belgium - Conference "Art and Sustainable Development"

See also
 Kinetic Art

References

External links

 
 Website of Solar Solidarity International
 Art Gallery of the Sun
 Website of workshops  "Fill in your own pattern!"

French artists
1973 births
Living people